Ribeira de Frades is a former civil parish in the municipality of Coimbra, Portugal. The population in 2011 was 1,902, in an area of 310 km2. On 28 January 2013 it merged with São Martinho do Bispo to form São Martinho do Bispo e Ribeira de Frades. It was one of the only freguesias with enclaves and exclaves. After the merging its enclave was maintained.

References 

Former parishes of Coimbra